Yacnier Luis (born 24 January 1982) is a Cuban hurdler. He competed in the men's 400 metres hurdles at the 2004 Summer Olympics.

References

1982 births
Living people
Athletes (track and field) at the 2004 Summer Olympics
Cuban male hurdlers
Olympic athletes of Cuba
Place of birth missing (living people)
21st-century Cuban people